Carlyle W. Begay is a Diné-American politician. A member of the Republican Party, he represented the seventh district in the Arizona State Senate which is the largest Legislative State District in the Continental United States.

Early life
Begay is Navajo and was born on the Navajo Nation and he is Tó’tsohnii (Big Water), born for Kinyaa’áanii (Towering House) clans. His maternal grandparents are Tl'izi lani (Many Goats clan). His paternal grandparents are also of the Tl'izi lani (Many Goats clan). Begay is a lifetime resident of Arizona and grew up on the Navajo Nation near Black Mesa and was raised under the teachings of his ancestry, instilling in him the importance of remembering the story of his people and carrying it on to his descendants.

Begay graduated from the University of Arizona with a Bachelor of Science degree in Molecular and Cellular Biology and was a student in the Minority Medical Education Program at the University of Arizona College of Medicine. He also attended the Arizona International College's Natural Sciences and Mathematics program in Tucson, Arizona; Johns Hopkins Bloomberg School of Public Health's Winter Institute, in Baltimore, Maryland; and the Harvard School of Public Health's Public Health Studies program in Boston, Massachusetts.

Political career
Begay succeeded Jack Jackson, Jr. in the Arizona State Senate in 2013 after Jackson's resignation. On November 23, 2015, Begay announced that he switched from the Democratic Party to the Republican Party.

In October 2020, he joined Navajo Nation Vice President Myron Lizer, Donald Trump Jr. and others in launching the Native Americans for Trump coalition in Williams, Arizona. He served as the co-chair of the Native Americans for Trump 2020 coalition, together with fellow Navajo Sharon Clahchischilliage.

References

External links

Living people
Arizona Democrats
Arizona state senators
Navajo people
Native American state legislators in Arizona
21st-century Native Americans
Arizona Republicans
University of Arizona alumni
People from Tuba City, Arizona
21st-century American politicians
Year of birth missing (living people)